This is a list of the series that have run in the Shueisha manga anthology book for young adults, Ultra Jump.  This list, organized by decade and year of when the series started, will list every single notable series run in the manga magazine, the author of the series and, in case the series has ended, when it has ended.

1990s

1995–1999

2000s

2000–2004

2005–2009

2010s

2010–2014

2015–2019

2020s

2020–present

Ultra Jump Egg

References

Manga magazines published in Japan
Lists of manga series